Werneth Low is a hill in Greater Manchester, England, and a part of the Pennines. The villages of Woodley, Greave, Gee Cross, Mottram and Romiley lie on the sides of the low.

The term "low" does not refer to any lack of altitude, it being a northern English word for hill.

Werneth Low offers panoramic views over the Greater Manchester Urban Area and, in clear weather, the Winter Hill transmitting station can be seen from here. To the south, Stockport town centre, part of
Wythenshawe in south Manchester and the Welsh Mountains can be viewed in clear weather.

The majority of Werneth Low is administered jointly by Hyde War Memorial Trust (link below) and Tameside Council. The trust organises the Remembrance and Peace day services. It was established to be guardian of Werneth Low, to keep it "For the people of Hyde" and provide a lasting monument to the 710 men of Hyde that perished in World War I.

Various landmarks can be seen from the top of Werneth Low, including: Manchester's Deansgate Square, Beetham Tower, the Oldham Civic Centre and Jodrell Bank Observatory's radio telescope (visible from the south-western end of the hilltop).

History
A flint knife and a Bronze Age stone mace head have been discovered on Werneth Low. Hangingbank is the site of a possible Iron Age farmstead dating to the first millennium BC, enclosed by a double ditch and featuring crop marks. A Roman road from Melandra to Astbury probably crosses the hill, however the exact course has not been identified. There is also evidence of Romano-British activity on Werneth Low; a sherd of Roman pottery dating to the 2nd century AD was discovered in the material filling one of the ditches at Hangingbank, indicating that was when the site fell out of use. There is a possible temporary Roman camp and excavations have recovered a posthole. The name Werneth derives from the Welsh verno for alder meaning 'the place where alders grow'.

In 1920, Lower Higham Farm and all of its land was purchased by the War Memorial Committee of the Hyde Borough Council and, in 1921, Hyde's main war memorial was officially unveiled. A Royal Observer Corps monitoring post was active here from 1962 to 1968, which was intended to give warning of hostile aircraft and nuclear attacks on the United Kingdom.

Transport
Werneth Low was served by bus number 304 on Mondays, Wednesdays and Saturdays only. With effect from 31 January 2010, GMPTE diverted this bus onto routes on which other bus services run and, as a result, Werneth Low is no longer served by any form of public transport.

Gallery

References

Bibliography

External links

 Werneth Low Country Park
 Hyde War Memorial Trust

Mountains and hills of the Pennines
Geography of Tameside
Tourist attractions in Tameside
Geography of the Metropolitan Borough of Stockport
Tourist attractions in the Metropolitan Borough of Stockport
Protected areas of Greater Manchester
Country parks in Greater Manchester
Hyde, Greater Manchester
Mountains and hills of the United Kingdom with toposcopes